A barrel roll is a vehicle maneuver mostly done in aircraft.

Barrel roll may also refer to:

 Barrel Roll (G.I. Joe), a fictional character in the G.I. Joe universe
 Barrel roll (turn), a type of airborne rotation performed in dance
 Operation Barrel Roll, military operation
 Competitive barrel rolling, a sport
 Barrel Roll, an obstacle in Kunoichi
 Barrel Roll, a maneuver in the Star Fox video game series commonly instructed by the character Peppy.

See also
 540 kick, advanced barrel roll in martial arts
 "Roll Out the Barrel", a World War II song
 Reverse barrel roll, a dance move
 Barrel (disambiguation)
 Roll (disambiguation)